Shotgun Wedding is the sole collaborative studio album by Lydia Lunch and Rowland S. Howard. It was released in May 1991, through record label Triple X.

Track listing

Critical reception 

AllMusic called the album an "alternative rock gem" and "one of Lunch's greatest achievements." Record Collector called it "an essential document for darkside dog-walkers, as both a reaffirmation of Howard's innovatory visions and snapshot of one of the last century's great damage-wallowing couples in fetid creative union."

Personnel 
 Lydia Lunch – vocals
 Rowland S. Howard – guitar
 Joe Drake – bass guitar
 Brent Newman – drums, tambourine, piano
 Link "Wreckage" Benka – rhythm guitar

 Technical

 J. G. Thirlwell – production
 Martin Bisi – mixing engineer
 Steve Martinez – sleeve art direction
 David Anthony – sleeve photography
 Ingrid Roisland – sleeve typesetting
"Thanks to Chris Bohn, Geoff Cox, Vanessa Skantze"

References

External links 
 

1991 albums
Lydia Lunch albums
Rowland S. Howard albums
Punk blues albums